Dimitrios Kaffatos (Greek: Δημήτριος Καφφάτος, born 20 March 1976) is a Greek retired handball player. He was a member of the Greece men's national handball team, playing as a goalkeeper. He was a part of the  team at the 2004 Summer Olympics. On club level he played for OF Nea Ionia, Ionikos Nea Filadelfeia and AEK Athens in Greece.

See also
Greece at the 2004 Summer Olympics

References

1976 births
Living people
Greek male handball players
Handball players at the 2004 Summer Olympics
Olympic handball players of Greece
Sportspeople from Athens